Kam Kart is a village in Jaghin-e Jonubi Rural District, Jaghin District, Rudan County, Hormozgan Province, Iran. At the 2006 census, its population was 866, in 182 families.

References 

Populated places in Rudan County